James Rothwell (1844 – 29 December 1927) was a New Zealand cricketer. He played in one first-class match for Canterbury in 1883/84.

See also
 List of Canterbury representative cricketers

References

External links
 

1844 births
1927 deaths
New Zealand cricketers
Canterbury cricketers
Sportspeople from Chester